The 2007 Pittsburgh Panthers football team represented the University of Pittsburgh in the 2007 NCAA Division I FBS football season. The biggest win of the season took place on December 1 when Pittsburgh defeated rival No. 2 West Virginia, 13–9.

Schedule

Coaching staff

Game summaries

Eastern Michigan

Grambling State

Michigan State

Connecticut

Virginia

Navy

Cincinnati

Louisville

Syracuse

Rutgers

South Florida

West Virginia

Team players drafted into the NFL

References

Pittsburgh
Pittsburgh Panthers football seasons
Pittsburgh Panthers football